Siege of Charleroi may refer to one of the following:
 Siege of Charleroi (1667), during the War of Devolution
 Siege of Charleroi (1693), during the War of the Grand Alliance
 Siege of Charleroi (1794), during the War of the First Coalition

See also
 Charleroi